Laurent Schwartz (born 6 October 1958, in Strasbourg, France) is a French oncologist and scientist.

Biography 
Laurent Schwartz comes from an Alsatian family of intellectuals imbued with scientific and medical culture. His father was Dean of the Faculty of medicine. He is a distant cousin of the mathematician Laurent Schwartz and the pediatrician Robert Debré.

Training 
After medical studies in his hometown, Laurent Schwartz left for the United States. He was researcher at the National Cancer Institute then resident at the Massachusetts General Hospital (Harvard University), where he specialized in radiation oncology. He returned to France in 1990 where he was recruited by the Assistance Publique des Hopitaux de Paris as a staff radiation therapist (1993).

Sources

Laurent Schwartz's books
1) Métastases: vérités sur le cancer. 1998 Hachette.

2) Cancer-Between Glycolysis and Physical Constraint: Between Glycolysis and Physical Constraint. 2004 Springer Science.

3) Cancer: A Dysmethylation Syndrome?. 2005 John Libbey Eurotext. (with Maurice Israël)

4) Le principe de vie 2007 La Martinière

5) Cancer guérir tous les malades 2013 Hugo doc

6) Cancer un traitement simple et non toxique 2016 Thierry Souccar

7) La fin des maladies ? 2018 Les liens qui libèrent

Living people
1958 births
French oncologists
Physicians from Strasbourg